Whittlesey (historically known as Whittlesea or Witesie) is an ancient Fenland market town east of Peterborough, in the Fenland district of Cambridgeshire in England.

Whittlesey may also refer to:

People
Abigail Goodrich Whittlesey (1788–1858), American educator, publisher, editor
Asaph Whittlesey (1826-1879), American state representative from Wisconsin and first settler of Ashland, Wisconsin
Charles Whittlesey, a number of people with the name
 Charles Whittlesey (geologist) (1808–1886), American geologist and archeologist
Whittlesey culture, an obsolete group of indigenous people named after the geologist
 Charles Frederick Whittlesey (1867–1941), American architect
 Charles White Whittlesey (1884–c. 1921), American soldier
 Charles Whittlesey (lawyer) (1819-1874), Connecticut lawyer, Union Soldier and briefly Virginia Attorney General
Elisha Whittlesey (1783–1863), American lawyer, civil servant and U.S. Representative from Ohio
Faith Whittlesey (1939–2018), American politician and White House Senior Staff member 
Julian Whittlesey (1905–1995), American architect
Samuel Whittlesey Dana (1760–1830), American lawyer and politician
Sarah J. C. Whittlesey (1824–1896), American author, poet, hymn writer
William Whittlesey (disambiguation), a number of people with the name
William Whittlesey, a 14th-century archbishop of Canterbury.
William A. Whittlesey (1796–1866), American politician, U.S. Representative from Ohio

Fictional characters
Diane Whittlesey, a fictional character played by Edie Falco on the television program Oz

Places
Whittlesey Creek, a creek in northern Wisconsin
Whittlesey Creek National Wildlife Refuge, a federally managed wetland complex in northern Wisconsin on the shore of Lake Superior
Lake Whittlesey, a proglacial lake that was an ancestor of present-day Lake Erie.
Whittlesey Mere, was an area of open water in the Fenland area of the county of Huntingdonshire (now Cambridgeshire), England
Whittlesey Museum, a social history museum located on the ground floor of the early 19th century Town Hall in Whittlesey, Cambridgeshire, UK
Whittlesey Rural District, a rural district in the Isle of Ely from 1894 to 1926

Others
Whittlesey Athletic F.C., a football club based in Whittlesey, Cambridgeshire, England

See also
Whittlesea (disambiguation)